José Narro Robles (born December 5, 1948 in Saltillo, Coahuila) is a Mexican researcher, academic, and politician. He is a former director of the Faculty of Medicine of the National Autonomous University of Mexico (UNAM) and was elected its 23rd Rector on November 20, 2007. After two 4-year periods leading UNAM, in February 2016, he was appointed by Mexican President Enrique Peña Nieto to replace Mercedes Juan as head of the Mexican Secretariat of Health.

Robles has enacted as adviser for the World Health Organization, WHO and UNICEF. He has been president of the National Academy of Medicine, of which he has been a member since 1992. He has also worked as General Director of Health Services of the Mexican Federal District, Secretary-General of the Mexican Institute of Social Security (IMSS), Undersecretary of Migratory Services and Population at the Ministry of the Interior (Secretaría de Gobernación) and Undersecretary of Health at the Federal Secretariat of Health. He holds a number of honorary doctorates from Latin American and European universities.

Honorary doctorates
University of Birmingham, United Kingdom, (2012).
Universidad de Santiago de Chile , Chile (2017),
Universidad de la Habana, Cuba, (2016).
Universidad Juárez Autónoma de Tabasco  (2011).
Universidad de Salamanca, Spain (2016).
Universidad Autónoma de Campeche, México, (2015) 
Benemérita Universidad Autónoma de Puebla (BUAP), México,  (2013)
Universidad Autónoma de Sinaloa, México, (2015).
Universidad Autónoma de San Luis Potosí (UASLP), México, 2015.
Universidad Autónoma de Nuevo León (UANL), México, (2016).

References

National Autonomous University of Mexico alumni
People from Saltillo
1948 births
Living people
Alumni of the University of Birmingham
Mexican Secretaries of Health